Filipe Campelos de Sousa (born 1 September 1991 in Guimarães) is a Portuguese footballer who plays for Pevidém as a midfielder.

Football career
On 29 July 2012, Sousa made his professional debut with Aves in a 2012–13 Taça da Liga match against Trofense.

References

External links
 
Stats and profile at LPFP 

1991 births
Living people
Sportspeople from Guimarães
Portuguese footballers
Association football midfielders
Liga Portugal 2 players
Amarante F.C. players
A.D. Lousada players
G.D. Ribeirão players
C.D. Aves players
S.C. Freamunde players
AD Oliveirense players
Pevidém S.C. players